Susanne Keil (born 18 May 1978 in Frankfurt am Main) is a female hammer thrower from Germany. Her personal best throw is 72.74 metres, achieved in July 2005 in Nikiti. This ranks her third among German hammer throwers, behind Betty Heidler and Kathrin Klaas. A member of LG Eintracht Frankfurt Keil is a two-time national champion in the women's hammer throw (2002 and 2003)

Achievements

References
 

1978 births
Living people
Sportspeople from Frankfurt
German female hammer throwers
Athletes (track and field) at the 2004 Summer Olympics
Olympic athletes of Germany